Yiannis Moralis (also transliterated Yannis Moralis or Giannis Moralis; 23 April 1916 – 20 December 2009) was an important Greek visual artist and part of the so-called "Generation of the '30s".

Life
Born in Arta, Greece, in 1916, Moralis moved to Athens with his parents in 1927. From the age of 15 he studied at the Athens School of Fine Arts under Umbertos Argyros and Konstantinos Parthenis. In 1936 he received a grant from this school to study for a year in Rome. After this, he went to Paris to study fresco and mural work at the École Nationale Supérieure des Beaux-Arts in Paris. He also studied mosaic at the École des Arts et Métiers.

When the Second World War broke out in 1939, Moralis returned to Greece. The first exhibition of one of his works was in 1940; numerous other exhibitions followed both nationally and internationally.

From 1947 Moralis taught at the Athens School of Fine Arts until his retirement in 1983. In 1949 he formed, with other artists including Nikos Hadjikyriakos-Ghikas, Yannis Tsarouchis, Nikos Nikolaou, Nikos Engonopoulos and Panayiotis Tetsis, the "Armos" art group. This group had its first exhibition in 1950 in Athens' Zappeion.

Moralis died on December 20, 2009 in Athens.

Works
Some of Moralis' most famous works include:
 Two Friends (1946)
 Pregnant Woman (1948)
 Seated Nude (1952)
Funeral Composition (1958)
 Erotiko (1990)

From the 1970s, he moved from the realistic depictions of the human form of his earlier works towards a geometric stylisation incorporating curves.

Over the years, Moralis was also involved with creating theatrical set and costume designs for the Greek National Theatre and the Greek National Ballet; illustrating poetic works by Odysseas Elytis and Giorgos Seferis; and decorating architectural works such as the façade of the Athens Hilton, the Metro-Station "Panepistimiou" and the Athens Central Station.

In 1965 he was decorated by King Constantine II with the Order of the Phoenix.

Art market
On the 13th of November 2019, Moralis' "Full Moon M" sold for 418,584 € on a Bonhams auction in London.

References

External links
 The Cangelaris Collection (English and Greek)

1916 births
2009 deaths
People from Arta, Greece
21st-century Greek painters
Recipients of the Order of the Phoenix (Greece)
Commanders of the Order of Honour (Greece)
20th-century Greek painters
Academic staff of the Athens School of Fine Arts